The European Federation of Neurological Societies was an organisation that united and supported neurologists across the whole of Europe. As of 2013, 45 European national neurological societies were registered members of the EFNS, and the federation represented more than 19,000 European neurologists. It was founded in 1991 in Vienna, Austria.

In June 2014 the federation, together with the European Neurological Society, founded the European Academy of Neurology. Both parent organisations were dissolved at the same time.

The European Federation of Neurological Societies (EFNS) was a different organization from the European Federation of Neurological Associations (EFNA). "Although EFNA [was] not an official member of the Federation [EFNS], it [did] work closely with the EFNS."

Member societies

Publications 
 Archive of the EFNS
 eBrain
 EFNS Directory
 European Journal of Neurology
 EFNS Guideline Papers
 Handbook of Neurological Management Volume 1 and 2
 Neuropenews

References

External links 
 

International medical associations of Europe
Neurology organizations
2014 disestablishments in Europe
1991 establishments in Europe
Organizations established in 1991
Organizations disestablished in 2014